The International Journal of Oral and Maxillofacial Surgery is a peer-reviewed medical journal covering oral and maxillofacial surgery, oral pathology, and related topics. It is published monthly by Elsevier for the International Association of Oral and Maxillofacial Surgeons.

References 

Dentistry journals
Elsevier academic journals
Surgery journals
Monthly journals
Publications established in 1972